Palm Harbor is an unincorporated community in Aransas County, in the U.S. state of Texas. According to the Handbook of Texas, its population was 125 in 2000. It is located within the Corpus Christi metropolitan area.

History
Palm Harbor was founded in 1960 when land developers Raulie Irwin, Sr., and Doyle Brashear wanted to build rental properties along Redfish Bay in an area in nearby Estes. A sales office opened in 1961, but business was halted when Hurricane Carla struck in September of that year. The houses in the community were small in size; only  or less. A long canal was built with lots on each side to link with the Gulf Intracoastal Waterway. It had a population of 125 in 1990 through 2000. Residents of the community worked and shopped in nearby Rockport, and is considered a bedroom community of Rockport.

Geography

Education
Today, the community is served by the Aransas County Independent School District.

References

Unincorporated communities in Aransas County, Texas
Unincorporated communities in Texas